Kappa Sigma, commonly known as Kappa Sig or KSig, is an American collegiate social fraternity founded at the University of Virginia in 1869. Kappa Sigma is one of the five largest international fraternities with currently 318 active chapters and colonies in North America. Its endowment fund, founded in 1919, has donated more than $5 million to undergrads since 1948. In 2012 alone, the Fraternity's endowment fund raised over $1 million in donations.

History

Traditional founding: 1400
According to the traditions of the fraternity, Kappa Sigma evolved from an ancient order, known in some accounts as "Kirjath Sepher", said to have been founded between 1395 and 1400 at the University of Bologna.
The story says that the corrupt governor of the city, one-time pirate and later papal usurper Baldassare Cossa, took advantage of the students at Bologna, one of Europe's preeminent universities which attracted students from all over the continent, by sending his men to assault and rob them; this motivated one of the university's scholars Manuel Chrysoloras to found a secret society of students beginning with five of his most devoted disciples, for mutual protection against Baldassare Cossa.

American founding: 1869–1880

On December 10, 1869, five students at the University of Virginia met in 46 East Lawn and founded the Kappa Sigma Fraternity in America. William Grigsby McCormick, George Miles Arnold, John Covert Boyd, Edmund Law Rogers, Jr., and Frank Courtney Nicodemus established the fraternity based on the traditions and of the ancient order in Bologna. These five founders became collectively known as the "Five Friends and Brothers".
In 1872, Kappa Sigma initiated Stephen Alonzo Jackson, who would go on to transform a struggling local fraternity into a strong international Brotherhood. The organization attributes much of its success to Jackson noting that, "Since his death in 1892, the success of the Order is the direct result of Jackson's devotion 'to make Kappa Sigma the leading college fraternity of the world.'"

In 1873, Kappa Sigma expanded to Trinity College (now Duke University), the University of Maryland, and Washington and Lee University. The fraternity attributes this growth to the initiation of Stephen Alonzo Jackson in 1872. During his membership, Jackson expanded and revised the ritual of Kappa Sigma. He created the Supreme Executive Committee (SEC), which now serves as the governing body of the Kappa Sigma Fraternity on an international level. Jackson also introduced the idea of a frequent, national convention of all Kappa Sigmas, a practice now continued by the biennial Grand Conclave, and characterized the event as "the finest hour" of Kappa Sigma.

History: 1880–2000
In 1885, the publication of Kappa Sigma's quarterly magazine was commissioned under the name The Quarterly This publication ran successfully for 5 years until it was reorganized to run bi-monthly and renamed The Caduceus, the name it holds to this day.

In 1912, Wilbur F. Denious (who would later become Worthy Grand Master) struck upon the idea to establish a charitable endowment for Kappa Sigma. As a result of the hard work of him and many others, the Kappa Sigma Endowment Fund was established in 1919 "to support the charitable and beneficent purposes of the Kappa Sigma Fraternity."

Recent history
In 2002, along with Phi Delta Theta, Kappa Sigma ended its involvement in the North American Interfraternity Conference at the national level due to disenchantment with the strategic direction of the organization.  However, many individual chapters remain members of their host university's Interfraternity Conference, but no chapter is required to recognize or be involved with their university's IFC if they should choose not to.

In 2003, the Kappa Sigma Fraternity ushered in an unprecedented era of growth for the fraternity.

In the Spring of 2005, Kappa Sigma Fraternity began fundraising for and construction of a new headquarters. This $6 million project had its grand opening on June 2, 2007. At the 66th Conclave, the Kappa Sigma Endowment Fund was declared to be the only official educational foundation of the fraternity and is also housed at the new headquarters.

Membership

Kappa Sigmas are taught to live their lives by the Star and Crescent, which are also the symbols of the Fraternity that make up the official badge:

They also follow the four pillars of the Fraternity: Fellowship, Leadership, Scholarship, and Service.

The Star and Crescent is also used as part of the guidelines behind Kappa Sigma's strict no-tolerance anti-hazing policy. The Fraternity takes all allegations of hazing very seriously and routinely revokes charters from guilty chapters which can be as old as 130 years.

To be eligible for membership a prospective member must profess a belief in God, though adherence to a specific religion is not required. In at least one situation, Kappa Sigma has revoked a chapter's charter for omitting the fraternity's religious requirements from its initiation.

Organization

Undergraduate organization
The Kappa Sigma Fraternity consists of over 300 chapters and colonies (probationary chapters). Each chapter is led by a five-member Executive Committee (EC), each referred to as an officer. These officers consist of the Grand Master (President), Grand Procurator (First Vice President), Grand Master of Ceremonies (Second Vice President), Grand Scribe (Secretary), and Grand Treasurer. Each chapter and colony also has a number of committee chairs that are assigned to specific areas (e.g. scholarship, sports, community service).

Volunteer organization
Over 1,500 alumni volunteer as advisors for Kappa Sigma.

At the international level, the Supreme Executive Council (SEC) sets policy for the fraternity, disciplines chapters, and approves the formation of colonies and chapter. The offices of the SEC mirror the office of the undergraduate EC and consist of the Worthy Grand Master (WGM), the Worthy Grand Procurator (WGP), the Worthy Grand Master of Ceremonies (WGMC), the Worthy Grand Scribe (WGS), and the Worthy Grand Treasurer (WGT). The WGM, WGP, and the WGMC each serve a two-year term, while the WGS and WGT each serve a four-year term with either the WGS or the WGT elected along with the other officers at the biennial Grand Conclave.

There are just under sixty districts covering America and Canada divided into five Areas. Typically, districts are composed of all the Kappa Sigma chapters and colonies within a State or Province, or a portion of a State or Province. Each district, composed of roughly 5 chapters each, are overseen by the District Grand Masters (DGM) and Assistant District Grand Masters (ADGM) who serve as liaisons between the undergraduate chapters and colonies and the SEC.

An Alumnus Adviser (an AA) and several Assistant Alumnus Advisers (AAA), provide advice and assistance to each undergraduate chapter and colony. Along with the Alumnus Adviser, there are traditionally one Assistant Alumnus Adviser for each of the four EC positions other than Grand Master. That is, there are AAAs for the undergraduate offices of GP, GMC, GT, and GS respectively.

There also exists several committees (each with a volunteer commissioner) under the SEC (e.g. ritual committee, business and finance committee, long-range planning committee). Each committee is made up strictly of volunteers and some contain various targeted subcommittees.

The Undergraduate Advisory Committee (UAC), which is made of one undergraduate from each of the five areas, is charged with representing their respective area as well as the general undergraduate perspective at all SEC meetings.

Professional staff
There is a professional staff that's based at the international headquarters in Charlottesville, Virginia, which manages the day-to-day operations of the Fraternity .

The staff includes the Executive Director, currently Mitchell Wilson, as well as multiple program-directors and administrative assistants.

Also, based in the international headquarters are the Area Recruitment Managers (ARM), who are in charge of recruitment goals and provide assistance to chapters in their respective service area.

General fraternity
While most activities of the Kappa Sigma Fraternity occur at the undergraduate chapters, the Fraternity oversees four international programs or campaigns.

A Greater Cause program
The Greater Cause program is designed to record the activities and reinforce the concept that Kappa Sigma members should play an active role in their communities. Specifically, the program aims at raising $25 for and dedicating 25 hours per year towards charitable causes for each member. The program also aims at having 100% of the eligible chapter members registered to vote. Every chapter organizes its own charitable events, usually donating the proceeds to Kappa Sigma's Military Heroes Campaign or a local charity.

Some of the bigger events that chapters organize are the "Catch-A-Dream Charity Classic Football Game" organized by the Delta-Chi Chapter at Mississippi State University, and the "Apple Cup Run," jointly organized by the Beta-Psi Chapter at the University of Washington and the Gamma-Mu Chapter at Washington State University. Or, the "Governor's Cup Ball Run," jointly organized by the Mu-Eta Chapter at the University of Louisville and the Beta-Nu Chapter at the University of Kentucky. The Chi-Omega Chapter at the University of South Carolina raises money annually for the Ray Tanner Foundation, which benefits economically and medically disadvantaged children in South Carolina, and the Columbia metropolitan area. The Kappa-Pi Chapter at the University of Central Oklahoma hosts the Bath Tub push that benefits the Veterans' Families United Foundation.

During the 2015-2016 school year, Kappa Sigma chapters and colonies donated $3,653,930 million and 671,537 volunteer hours to charitable causes around the United States and Canada.

Champion Quest program
Kappa Sigma's Champion Quest Program is a "results-driven" recruitment initiative aimed at increasing the number of men added to the Kappa Sigma each year.

The fraternity attributes its success to "its pursuit of Jackson's Dream", a reference to the dream of the influential member Steven Alonzo Jackson, and notes that the campaign has "yielded thirteen consecutive years of record-setting membership growth and elevated Kappa Sigma to new heights, as the most preferred college fraternity in North America."

Brothers in Action program
Brothers in Action (BIA) is the "official membership development program of Kappa Sigma Fraternity" which seeks both individual and chapter development through goal setting and through emphasizing the four cornerstones of Kappa Sigma: Fellowship, Leadership, Scholarship and Service.

The Brothers in Action program begins with the "BIA for Pledges program" and continues throughout your involvement with Kappa Sigma, including opportunities for personal growth and development at the various leadership conferences and conclaves.

Military Heroes Campaign
During the 66th Grand Conclave in 2007, the Fraternity announced a new charity entitled the "Kappa Sigma Fraternity Military Heroes Campaign". Since its inception, the campaign has donated over $1,000,000 to non-profit organizations who advocate on behalf of servicemen and women and those wounded in combat. The Supreme Executive Committee determines how the contributions will be distributed to support these patriots and veterans. Some of these charities include the Fisher House Foundation, the SEAL Legacy Foundation, and the Valour Place.

Kappa Sigma Endowment Fund
In 1919, the Kappa Sigma Endowment Fund was established "to support the charitable and beneficent purposes of the Kappa Sigma Fraternity". The Endowment Fund's first donors contributed $101 as the foundation for the fund's assets. Currently, the Endowment Fund has two primary recognition levels for donors, the One of Jackson's Men program - for donors who contributed $1000 or more to the Endowment Fund, and the Heritage Society for planned gift donors.

The Endowment Fund assists with the educational and leadership programming at each Conclave and Leadership Conference. In addition, each year, the Endowment Fund awards $250,000 in scholarships to undergraduate members. These Scholarship and Leadership Awards are presented on Founders' Day (December 10). To date, the Endowment Fund has contributed over $5 million in scholarships since 1948.

Currently, the Endowment Fund, along with the Kappa Sigma Fraternity, holds in trust for the members of Kappa Sigma, the fraternity's headquarters in Charlottesville, Virginia.

The Endowment Fund sponsors leadership conferences and Kappa Sigma's Biennial Grand Conclave. In 2015, the 70th Biennial Grand Conclave was held in Las Vegas, Nevada.

Controversies
In 2020, the chapter at Fresno State University was placed on interim suspension after they were accused of sexual assault at a party. Once hearing of the accusation, the university president immediately suspended the fraternity pending an investigation.

In 2019, the chapter at the University of Central Florida was suspended and placed under conduct review by the university after a pledge reported to authorities his pledge class were ordered to smoke pot, drink entire bottles of alcohol, and sometimes sell their prescribed drugs – like Adderall – to fraternity members. He also reported they were made to stand in pitch black hallways in suit and tie while fraternity members yelled insults and that cocaine use was popular in the fraternity

In 2018, the chapter at the University of Arizona was shut down after an investigation found multiple violations of the university's student code of conduct.  The chapter will be eligible to seek reinstatement in May 2023 and was the second fraternity on campus to be shut down in 2018 due to multiple misconduct violations.

In 2017, two civil lawsuits were filed against the fraternity and the University of Louisiana at Lafayette (ULL) by the family of a deceased ULL student killed by a Kappa Sigma pledge in 2016. Rustam Nizamutdinova, an undergraduate engineering student from Uzbekistan, was walking down a street when he was struck by a car driven by a Kappa Sigma pledge who fell asleep at the wheel. The pledge was severely sleep-deprived due to his illegal and strenuous pledging process. The fraternity's charter at ULL was revoked and five other Greek organizations received varying levels of disciplinary action after Nizamutdinova's death initiated thorough investigations into Greek culture on campus.

In 2017, dozens of Kappa Sigma members initiated at Louisiana State University were expelled by the national leadership of the fraternity for allegations of repeated hazing violations, drug usage, and misconduct.

In 2016, the Kappa Sigma fraternity at California State University, Long Beach was suspended after a female student reported to authorities she was sexually assaulted while attending a party they hosted.  National leadership of the fraternity suspended the chapter as a result of the incident.

In 2015, the chapter at Cornell University was placed on suspension and lost all alcohol privileges due to repeated hazing and alcohol violations.

In 2015, the Kappa Sigma fraternity at Miami University ceased to be recognized by the national headquarters because of hazing, which included forcing pledges to work out between 3:30 a.m. and 6 a.m., no showers, cleaning fraternity member rooms, forced alcohol consumption, and buying fraternity members food.

In 2015, two Kappa Sigma members from West Virginia University were arrested and charged with hazing and conspiracy for the death of Nolan Burch at a Big/Little event four days after the chapter had been closed by the Fraternity.  Burch died due to alcohol poisoning, his blood alcohol level was .493.

In 2014, the Kappa Sigma fraternity at the University of Kansas was placed on a two-year suspension after two female students reported to authorities they were victims of sexual assault on two different occasions while attending a party at the fraternity house.

At a Kappa Sigma fraternity house at Tulane University in 2013, police found grams of marijuana, 68.7 grams of psilocybin mushrooms, over 50 doses of LSD, .91 grams of DMT, 47.6 grams of opium and paraphernalia, and .75 grams of powdered cocaine. Two fraternity members were arrested and charge for possession of the drugs.

In 2006, four Kappa Sigma members and an alumnus member from Winthrop University were arrested for detonating ice bombs in the backyard of their fraternity house.  The fraternity was placed on social suspension by national leadership of the fraternity.

In 2001, an 18-year-old freshman named Chad Meredith, who was interested in joining the chapter at the University of Miami, drowned after being persuaded by fraternity members to swim across a nearly seven-foot-deep lake near campus.  Meredith had a blood alcohol level of .13 prior to his death.  Although fraternity officials and Miami-Dade Police stated the incident was not a fraternity-sanctioned hazing event, a jury found otherwise and awarded Meredith's parents a $12.6 million verdict in a negligence suit based on hazing.  As a result of Meredith's death, a law was named in his honor making hazing officially a criminal offense in the State of Florida. Eight years later, the chapter was punished by its international office due to "social and alcohol violations contrary to their codes of conduct."

Discriminatory incidents
The founding chapter at the University of Virginia has been investigated by the university and the student-run Inter Fraternity Council multiple times for alleged incidents of racist costumes and parties. In 2009, the chapter hosted a "Cowboys & Indians"-themed party where, according to photographs posted to social media, some members dressed in fake Native American costumes, wore Redface, and posed for photographs simulating scalping. In 2011, members of the chapter again hosted a similarly themed party, decorating the outside of their chapter house with imitations of Native American art, constructing a fake tipi, and dressing in costumes; this occurred despite intervention by the university and the Native American Student Union following the previous event to educate the chapter on cultural appropriation and violence against Native Americans. In 2019, the chapter hosted a bid event that featured multiple members wearing fake Native American headdresses and costumes; the Inter Fraternity Council and the Office of Fraternity & Sorority Life at the university both investigated the incident.

Chapter list

Notable alumni

Grand Conclaves

See also
List of social fraternities and sororities

Notes

References

External links
 Official Website
 Kappa Sigma Endowment Fund

 
1869 establishments in Virginia
Fraternity Leadership Association
International student societies
Student organizations established in 1869
Active former members of the North American Interfraternity Conference